Mark William O'Rourke (born July 7, 1962 in Charlottetown, Prince Edward Island) is a Canadian curler.

O'Rourke has been to the Brier on 13 occasions (1991, 1993, 1995, 1996, 1997, 1999, 2001, 2006, 2007, 2008, 2009, 2010, 2020) but has never won. He played second for Robert Campbell for all of the Briers until 2006 except 1996 (alternate for Peter MacDonald) and 2001 (second for MacDonald). In 2007 and 2008 he was second for Peter Gallant, in 2009 he played lead for Rod MacDonald and in 2010 he was second for Rod. 

In 2020, O'Rourke joined the Bryan Cochrane rink as lead, as the only resident Islander. The team, which also included PEI-natives (but Ontario residents) Ian MacAulay and Morgan Currie won the 2020 PEI Tankard and will represent Prince Edward Island at the 2020 Tim Hortons Brier. 

Despite the lack of success at the Brier, O'Rourke has been able to win one national championship- in 1989 playing second for Robert Campbell, he won the Canadian Mixed Curling Championship.

Personal life
He is married to Kathy O'Rourke. He is the co-owner of Beaton's Wholesale Dry Goods Limited.

References

External links

1962 births
Curlers from Prince Edward Island
Living people
Sportspeople from Charlottetown
Canadian male curlers
Canadian mixed curling champions